

Aldherus was a medieval Bishop of Elmham.

Aldherus was consecrated before 785 and died sometime after 805.

Notes

References

External links
 

Bishops of Elmham